Michael Muthu is an Indian director, writer and actor who has worked on theatre productions and films. He is based in Chennai.

Career
Michael Muthu started his career in theatre after finishing his schooling, and was a member of the Loyola Theatre Society during his first two years of college. In 1991, he became the founder of the Chennai-based theatre group, Boardwalkers. He has since worked on productions including God, Biloxi Blues, The Hairy Ape, Sleuth, The Pied Piper of Hamlin, and Jesus Christ Superstar. In the early 1990s, he starred alongside M. Night Shyamalan in the director's English film Praying with Anger (1992), while he also played supporting roles in French and Italian productions based in India in the late 1990s.

In 2002, Michael began working on directing an English film titled The Girl, and despite it completing production, it was previewed to audiences but not released theatrically as he could not find distributors. In January 2017, he announced plans to make a bilingual film titled The Way Things Are in English and Theeviram in Tamil, produced by Sameer Bharat Ram. Starring Gokul Anand, Amzath Khan and Arjun Chidambaram in the lead roles, the film was shot in 2017 and had a delayed OTT release on the Simply South platform in November 2020.

In a rare Indian film appearance, he starred in Shankar's 2.0 (2018) as a police officer, working alongside Rajinikanth. He also portrayed the role of Sushant Singh Rajput's father in his final film, Dil Bechara (2020).

Partial filmography
Films

References

External links

Living people
21st-century Indian film directors
Tamil film directors
Film directors from Chennai
Indian film directors
Tamil screenwriters
Indian screenwriters
Screenwriters from Chennai
Indian male dramatists and playwrights
20th-century Indian dramatists and playwrights
Tamil dramatists and playwrights
Indian theatre directors
Indian male stage actors
20th-century Indian male actors
Male actors from Chennai
1968 births